Ian Bailey (born 1959 in Kent, England) was the Head Buyer and later Financial Director of Games Workshop until 1985. He left Games Workshop to write books and develop games.  He has had seven books published in three languages and three games in the UK and United States.  He was a best-selling author in France with the Compton Murder, an interactive detective book, published by Éditions Gallimard.

Education
Ian Bailey gained his first degree in English Literature with Anglo-Saxon at the University of York; he has a CIM Diploma in Marketing and a master's degree in European Marketing.

Career
Joined Games Workshop Ltd in 1982, first as the Retail Buyer, then Head Buyer and finally Financial Director. In 1985 he left Games Workshop to write Adventure Game Books and found Hatch with Albie Fiore and Ian Waddelow, who were both former Games Workshop employees. Hatch worked within the publishing industry, primarily in conjunction with Penguin books. The partners in Hatch eventually went their separate ways. Ian went on to found Folio Works Ltd., and a highly successful consultancy called ADI. Ian Bailey and Gary Chalk created the game Fantasy Warlord (1990) to compete with Games Workshop's Warhammer Fantasy Battle, but Fantasy Warlord did not last long.

In 1994 he semi-retired to become a Senior Lecturer and Head of European Studies at the University of Derby. Working in conjunction with Loughborough University, he gained recognition from Brussels for the creation of a European Centre of Excellence in the East Midlands. In 1997 he was elected a Fellow of the Royal Society of Arts.

In 1999 he returned full-time to ADI. In 2000 he co-founded ADI Trading Ltd and became the full owner in 2013.  This company represents several German and American brands including Schott Zwiesel, Jenaer Glas, Zwiesel 1872, Fries, and Fortessa.  The company operates primarily in the United Kingdom hotel and restaurant sectors.  It supplies tritan titanium crystal, bone china, porcelain and metalware.  It is a sponsor of the International Wine Challenge and the Chaine des Rotisseurs Young Sommeliers under the brand name Schott Zwiesel.

In 2014 he became Vice Charge des Missions of the City of London Bailliage, Chaine des Rotisseurs. In  2016 he became Conseiller Gastronomique for the Bailliage de Grande Bretagne.

Publications

Books
 1999 : La Villa des Revenants, Gallimard, Paris ;
 1990 : Fantasy Warlord Folio Works, Derbyshire ;
 1996 : Le Mystere de Compton, Gallimard, Paris ;
 1993 : La Villa des Revenants, Gallimard, Paris ;
 1992 : Le Mystere de Compton, Gallimard, Paris ;
 1988 : The Eye, Virgin, London;
 1985 : Terrors Out of Time, Magnet, London
 1985 : Where the Shadows Stalk, Magnet, London;

Games
 1987: James Clavell's Shogun, FASA Inc, Chicago
 1987 : James Clavell's Tai-Pan, FASA Inc, Chicago
 1987 : James Clavell's Noble House, FASA Inc, Chicago
 1985 : The Eye of the Idol, Octopus, London (Marks and Spencer Plc 1411119)

Articles
 2006, Going Glassy Eyed, The World of Fine Wine, London ISSN 1743-503X;
 1984, The Goblin Cult of Kernu, White Dwarf 49, Games Workshop, London;
 1983, Crom Cruach, White Dwarf 48, Games Workshop, London;
 1983, Extracts from the Travels of Tralk True-Eye, White Dwarf 47, Games Workshop, London;
 1983, The Shadows of Yog Sothoth, White Dwarf 44, Games Workshop, London;
 1982, Call of Cthulhu, White Dwarf 32, Games Workshop, London;
 1982, RuneQuest in England, The Gamer, AHC Publications, Luton

References

External links
 ADI Trading Ltd
 ADI Trading Ltd, Appelgate

English male writers
1959 births
Living people
Academics of the University of Derby
Alumni of the University of York